All My Sons is a 1948 film noir suspense post-WWII drama directed by Irving Reis, based on Arthur Miller's 1946 play of the same name, and starring Edward G. Robinson and Burt Lancaster. The supporting cast features Louisa Horton, Mady Christians, Howard Duff, Arlene Francis, and Harry Morgan.

Plot
Joe Keller is sorry to hear son Chris plans to wed Ann Deever and move to Chicago, for he hoped Chris would someday take over the manufacturing business Joe built from the ground up.

Ann's father Herb was Joe’s business partner, but when both men were charged with shipping defective airplane parts that resulted in wartime crashes and deaths, only Herb was convicted and sent to prison.

Another son of the Kellers' is in the Army air corps, missing in action and presumed dead. Ann used to be engaged to him and her engagement to his brother upsets Kate Keller, who hasn't yet accepted that son Larry is gone for good.

Ann's attorney brother George strongly discourages her from marrying a Keller, and many in town still whisper that Joe was responsible for the death of twenty-one pilots. A war widow even calls Joe a murderer to his face in a restaurant.

On a visit to Ann's father in prison, Chris hears how Joe called in sick on the one day the Army came to pick up the airplane parts. Joe admits to Chris that he knew they were defective, but repairs would have been costly and could have bankrupted the business. Chris strikes his father in anger at hearing this.

A letter from Larry reveals that he knew of his father's guilt and intended to go on a suicide mission in a plane, no longer wanting to live with the family's shame. This is the final disgrace for Joe, who shoots himself.  Chris and Ann leave together with Kate's blessing to their future.

Cast
 Edward G. Robinson as Joe Keller
 Burt Lancaster as Chris Keller
 Louisa Horton as Ann Deever
 Mady Christians as Kate Keller
 Frank Conroy as Herb Deever
 Howard Duff as George Deever
 Lloyd Gough as Jim Bayliss
 Arlene Francis as Sue Bayliss
 Harry Morgan as Frank Lubey (as Henry Morgan)
 Elisabeth Fraser as Lydia Lubey

Production
Reportedly Burt Lancaster postponed his own first production, Kiss the Blood Off My Hands in order to take the role of Chris, an ex-GI who initially idolizes his father, not knowing what he has done.

Reception

Box Office
The film made a relatively small loss for Universal.

Critical response

In his film review, critic Bosley Crowther contrasted Arthur Miller's play to the screenplay. While stating that the screenplay was more restrained, he praised the acting. He wrote, "In the role of this rugged individualist, Mr. Robinson does a superior job of showing the shades of personality in a little tough guy who has a softer side. Arrogant, ruthless, and dynamic in those moments when his 'business' is at stake, he is also tender and considerate in the presence of those he loves ... As the right-thinking son of this corrupt man, Burt Lancaster is surprisingly good and, although he appears a bit dim-witted at times, that is not implausible. Louisa Horton is natural as his sweetheart and Mady Christians plays the mother intensely. Irving Reis' direction is slightly stilted in some scenes but generally matches the tempo of a fluid script".

Accolades
Nominations
 Writers Guild of America Award: Best Written American Drama - Chester Erskine; The Robert Meltzer Award (Screenplay Dealing Most Ably with Problems of the American Scene) - Chester Erskine; 1949.

References

External links

Streaming audio
 All My Sons on Screen Directors Playhouse: December 2, 1949

1940s American films
1948 drama films
1948 films
American black-and-white films
American drama films
American films based on plays
Films directed by Irving Reis
Films scored by Leith Stevens
Universal Pictures films